Cornelis William Hendrik Fuhler (3 July 1964 – 19 July 2020) was a Dutch/Australian improvisor, composer, and instrument builder associated with free jazz, experimental music and acoustic ecology. He played piano by manipulating sound with electromagnetic string stimulators like Ebows and motorized actuators. Fuhler also performed on guitar, turntables and synthesizer. He invented the keyolin, a combination of keyboard and violin.

Fuhler was a student of Misha Mengelberg of the Instant Composers Pool. He recorded the album Corkestra (Data, 2005) with Ab Baars, Tony Buck, Tobias Delius, Wilbert de Joode, Anne La Berge, Andy Moor, Nora Mulder, and Michael Vatcher. Fuhler played prepared piano, analog keyboards, clavinet, melodica, and electric lamellophone. Fuhler played solo prepared piano on his album Stengam (Potlatch, 2007).
In 2016 he attained a PhD in composition at the University of Sydney and in 2017 he published his book Disperse and Display covering modular composing strategies and extended piano techniques.

Fuhler "died unexpectedly" at his home in Australia.

Discography
 1995 7 CC in 10 (Geestgronden)
 1996 The Psychedelic Years Palinckx (Vonk)
 1998 Bellagram (Geestgronden)
 1999 DJ Cor Blimey and his Pigeon (ConundromCD)
 2001 The Flirts (Erstwhile), duo with Gert-Jan Prins
 2002 The Hands of Caravaggio, as part of M.I.M.E.O., featuring John Tilbury (Erstwhile)
 2003 Tinderbox (Data)
 2005 HHHH (Unsounds)
 2005 ONJO (Doubtmusic)
 2005 Corkestra (Data)
 2007 Stengam (Potlatch)
 2007 The Culprit, duo with Keith Rowe (7hings)
 2011 Gas Station Sessions (Platenbakerij)
 2014 Truancy (Splitrec)
 2016 Mungo (Splitrec)
 2017 FAN (SoundOut)
 2019 Fietstour (WhirrbooM! Records)

References

External links
Official site
 Whitehead, Kevin. New Dutch Swing (1998). New York: Billboard Books. .
Disperse and Display Sydney: Giwalo Press, 2017. .

1964 births
2020 deaths
People from Emmen, Netherlands
Free improvisation
Electroacoustic improvisation
Dutch experimental musicians
Dutch emigrants to Australia
University of Sydney alumni